Elsevier is a publisher and information and analytics company.

Elsevier may also refer to:
 Elsevier (magazine), a Dutch-language magazine
 Elsevier Masson, a French publisher
 Arnout Elsevier (1579 – c. 1656), Dutch painter

See also
 
 Elsevere
 Elzevir (disambiguation)